Metropia may refer to:

 Metropia (film), a 2009 Swedish animated film
 Metropia (TV series), a Canadian television drama